Overton "Sobe" Love (1823-1906) was a Chickasaw judge in Indian Territory in the nineteenth century. Love was born in Holly Springs, Mississippi , the son of Colonel Henry W. Love. Overton was among the Chickasaw forced to move to Indian Territory in the 1840s during Indian removal. Love was a judge in the Pickens District of the Chickasaw Nation for many years. As a judge in the Dawes Commission era, Love worked to add tribal members to the Chickasaw Roll of Citizenship. Love also served as a Chickasaw representative to Congress and was named Treaty Commissioner on behalf of the Chickasaw Nation.

Love County, Oklahoma was named after Overton Love. He died in November 1906.

References
→

1823 births
1906 deaths
20th-century Native Americans
Chickasaw people
Love County, Oklahoma
Native American judges
People of Indian Territory
Pre-statehood history of Oklahoma
19th-century American judges
19th-century Native Americans